= NGC 7824 =

Galaxy in the constellation Pisces

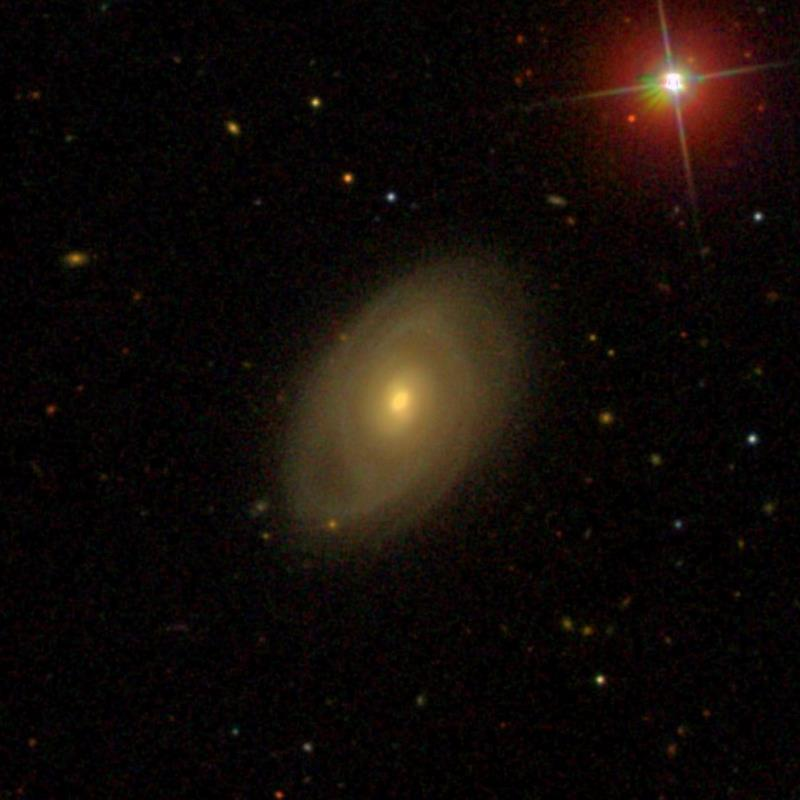

Observation data
- Constellation: Pisces
- Right ascension: 00^{h} 06^{m} 26^{s}
- Declination: +07° 03′ 53″

NGC 7824 is an early-type spiral galaxy located in the constellation Pisces, situated close to the celestial equator. It was discovered on September 25, 1830, by the astronomer John Herschel. NGC 7824 was Studied for its bulge, disk properties, stellar populations, and radio emissions, linking it to galaxy evolution and mass. It is part of larger groupings or clusters. It is 105-200+ million light-years away, with a magnitude of 13.2. Its Right Ascension is 00h 06m, and its Declination is 06° 55'.

NGC 7824 is also known as UGC 34, PGC 354, MCG 1-1-25, and CGCG 408-25.
